György Mogoy (born 14 August 1924) is a Hungarian former footballer who played in the 1940s and 1950s. He played mainly in the position as defender, but also as midfielder.

Mogoy was born in Igal, Hungary. He played three seasons for Czechoslovakian club ŠK Slovan Bratislava and one season each for Italian club Catania and Spanisch club RCD Mallorca before he moved to Switzerland. Here he first played one season for Grasshopper Club Zürich.

Mogoy joined FC Basel's first team for their 1952–53 season under player-coach René Bader. After playing in five test matches, Mogoy played his domestic league debut for his new club in the away game on 31 August 1952 as Basel played a 2–2 draw with BSC Young Boys. He scored his first goal for his club per penalty on 19 April 1953 in the home game at the Landhof against Lausanne-Sport. Mogoy's biggest success was the championship title that season. Basel won 17 of the 26 league games, losing only once, and they won the championship four points clear of Young Boys in second position.

Between the years 1952 and 1956 Mogoy played a total of 113 games for Basel scoring a total of six goals. 65 of these games were in the Nationalliga A, eight in the Swiss Cup and 40 were friendly games. He scored his six goals all in the domestic league.

Following his time with FC Basel Mogoy moved on to play for Nordstern Basel and after two seasons with them he ended his active football career.

References

Sources
 Rotblau: Jahrbuch Saison 2017/2018. Publisher: FC Basel Marketing AG. 
 Die ersten 125 Jahre. Publisher: Josef Zindel im Friedrich Reinhardt Verlag, Basel. 
 Verein "Basler Fussballarchiv" Homepage

1924 births
Possibly living people
FC Basel players
FC Nordstern Basel players
Grasshopper Club Zürich players
Hungarian footballers
Association football defenders